Iron Butterfly is an American psychedelic rock band. 

Iron Butterfly may also refer to:

Iron butterfly (options strategy), an investment strategy
 Iron Butterfly (comics), a comic book character
 The Iron Butterfly, a 1989 Hong Kong action film directed by Johnnie To
A nickname for the 1930s movie musical star Jeanette MacDonald
A nickname for Imelda Marcos, of the Philippines
A rock climbing route on Windtower, a mountain in Alberta, Canada